Chalkis Shipyards S.A. is a large shipyard in Aulis, in Evia, Central Greece, near Chalkis.

It's one of the biggest shipyards in operation in Greece with two floating docks. Some of the facilities in operation include mechanical workshop, plateshop, piping shop, electrical shop, carpentry shop, power supply sub stations. 

Chalkis shipyards is currently expanding operation in offshore wind technology announcing works on innovative design of floating wind plants in collaboration with National Technical University of Athens and Hellenic Centre for Marine Research. The design is called FloatMast platform and the purpose is to create a new turbine technology. To this end Chalkis shipyards aims to invest €100 million.

References

External links 
 

Shipbuilding companies of Greece
Greek brands
1971 establishments in Greece
Renewable energy companies of Greece
Chalcis